Concrete Igloo is the first full-length album by Canadian post-industrial band Dandi Wind. All songs were written and produced by Szam Findlay, with Dandilion Wind Opaine providing vocals.

Critical reception
Drowned in Sound wrote that the album is "energetic, confrontational and bizarre electronic noise with a strong vein of inventive humour and a breathless speediness to its rhythms" and has a "varied and somewhat deranged set of subject matter...one which surely requires a varied and somewhat deranged melodic setting".

Track listing
(all songs written by Szam Findlay)

References

External links
 Discogs page for "Concrete Igloo"

Dandi Wind albums
2005 albums
Experimental music albums by Canadian artists